Dommartin-la-Montagne is a commune in the Meuse department in Grand Est in north-eastern France.

The village is located in a steep sided valley. During World War I the village was behind the German lines. In the battle of Les Éparges the village was completely destroyed except for one house next to the stream which runs through the village. The village was finally occupied by the French after help arrived from the Americans. The village was rebuilt after the war.

The village is centred on a single street. A small lane leads up towards the church then up onto farmland.

See also
Communes of the Meuse department
Parc naturel régional de Lorraine

References

Dommartinlamontagne